Campsosternus is a genus of click beetles in the subfamily Dendrometrinae. The genus is extant but there is at least one described species from the Eocene of the Czech Republic.

Description of some species 
There are many species, including:
 Campsosternus auratus (Drury, 1773)
 †Campsosternus atavus Deichmüller 1881 a fossil species found in an Eocene lacustrine small diatomite in Kutschlin near Bilin, in the Czech Republic
 Campsosternus dohrni Westwood 1847
 Campsosternus hopei Westwood 1847
 Campsosternus stephensi (Hope, 1831)
 Campsosternus gemma - the Rainbow sheath click beetle (彩虹叩頭蟲 in Chinese), a protected species in Taiwan
 Campsosternus templetoni Westwood, 1848 (name is a tribute to Robert Templeton (1802–1892), a naturalist, artist and entomologist

See also 
 List of click beetle genera of India

References

External links 

 
 
 
 Campsosternus at Biolib.cz
 Campsosternus at insectoid.info

Elateridae genera
Dendrometrinae